Erysiphe pisi is a plant pathogen that causes powdery mildew on several plant species.

References

Fungal plant pathogens and diseases
pisi
Fungi described in 1821